The Bishop of Hamilton is the title for the holder of one of several Catholic episcopal sees:
 The Diocese of Hamilton, Ontario, Canada
 The Diocese of Hamilton, Bermuda
 The Diocese of Hamilton, New Zealand